Parliamentary elections were held in Norway on 21 October 1915, with a second round between 4 and 11 November. The result was a victory for the Liberal Party, which won 74 of the 123 seats in the Storting.

Results

References

General elections in Norway
1910s elections in Norway
Norway
Parliamentary
Norway